A low-level programming language is a programming language that provides little or no abstraction from a computer's instruction set architecture—commands or functions in the language map that are structurally similar to processor's instructions. Generally, this refers to either machine code or assembly language. Because of the low (hence the word) abstraction between the language and machine language, low-level languages are sometimes described as being "close to the hardware". Programs written in low-level languages tend to be relatively non-portable, due to being optimized for a certain type of system architecture.

Low-level languages can convert to machine code without a compiler or interpreter—second-generation programming languages use a simpler processor called an assembler—and the resulting code runs directly on the processor. A program written in a low-level language can be made to run very quickly, with a small memory footprint. An equivalent program in a high-level language can be less efficient and use more memory. Low-level languages are simple, but considered difficult to use, due to numerous technical details that the programmer must remember. By comparison, a high-level programming language isolates execution semantics of a computer architecture from the specification of the program, which simplifies development.

Machine code 

Machine code is the only language a computer can process directly without a previous transformation. Currently, programmers almost never write programs directly in machine code, because it requires attention to numerous details that a high-level language handles automatically. Furthermore, it requires memorizing or looking up numerical codes for every instruction, and is extremely difficult to modify.

True machine code is a stream of raw, usually binary, data. A programmer coding in "machine code" normally codes instructions and data in a more readable form such as decimal, octal, or hexadecimal which is translated to internal format by a program called a loader or toggled into the computer's memory from a front panel.

Although few programs are written in machine languages, programmers often become adept at reading it through working with core dumps or debugging from the front panel.

Example: A function in hexadecimal representation of 32-bit x86 machine code to calculate the nth Fibonacci number:
 8B542408 83FA0077 06B80000 0000C383
 FA027706 B8010000 00C353BB 01000000
 B9010000 008D0419 83FA0376 078BD989
 C14AEBF1 5BC3

Assembly language 
Second-generation languages provide one abstraction level on top of the machine code. In the early days of coding on computers like TX-0 and PDP-1, the first thing MIT hackers did was to write assemblers.
Assembly language has little semantics or formal specification, being only a mapping of human-readable symbols, including symbolic addresses, to opcodes, addresses, numeric constants, strings and so on. Typically, one machine instruction is represented as one line of assembly code. Assemblers produce object files that can link with other object files or be loaded on their own.

Most assemblers provide macros to generate common sequences of instructions.

Example: The same Fibonacci number calculator as above, but in x86-64 assembly language using AT&T syntax:
_fib:
        movl $1, %eax
        xorl %ebx, %ebx
.fib_loop:
        cmpl $1, %edi
        jbe .fib_done
        movl %eax, %ecx
        addl %ebx, %eax
        movl %ecx, %ebx
        subl $1, %edi
        jmp .fib_loop
.fib_done:
        ret

In this code example, hardware features of the x86-64 processor (its registers) are named and manipulated directly. The function loads its input from %edi in accordance to the System V ABI and performs its calculation by manipulating values in the EAX, EBX, and ECX registers until it has finished and returns. Note that in this assembly language, there is no concept of returning a value. The result having been stored in the EAX register, the RET command simply moves code processing to the code location stored on the stack (usually the instruction immediately after the one that called this function) and it is up to the author of the calling code to know that this function stores its result in EAX and to retrieve it from there. x86-64 assembly language imposes no standard for returning values from a function (and in fact, has no concept of a function); it is up to the calling code to examine state after the procedure returns if it needs to extract a value.

Compare this with the same function in C, a high-level language:

unsigned int fib(unsigned int n) {
   if (!n)
       return 0;
   else if (n <= 2)
       return 1;
   else {
       unsigned int a, c;
       for (a = c = 1; ; --n) {
           c += a;
           if (n <= 2) return c;
           a = c - a;
       }
   }
}

This code is very similar in structure to the assembly language example but there are significant differences in terms of abstraction:

 The input (parameter n) is an abstraction that does not specify any storage location on the hardware. In practice, the C compiler follows one of many possible calling conventions to determine a storage location for the input.
 The assembly language version loads the input parameter from the stack into a register and in each iteration of the loop decrements the value in the register, never altering the value in the memory location on the stack. The C compiler could load the parameter into a register and do the same or could update the value wherever it is stored. Which one it chooses is an implementation decision completely hidden from the code author (and one with no side effects, thanks to C language standards).
 The local variables a, b and c are abstractions that do not specify any specific storage location on the hardware. The C compiler decides how to actually store them for the target architecture.
 The return function specifies the value to return, but does not dictate how it is returned. The C compiler for any specific architecture implements a standard mechanism for returning the value. Compilers for the x86 architecture typically (but not always) use the EAX register to return a value, as in the assembly language example (the author of the assembly language example has chosen to copy the C convention but assembly language does not require this).

These abstractions make the C code compilable without modification on any architecture for which a C compiler has been written. The x86 assembly language code is specific to the x86 architecture.

Low-level programming in high-level languages 
During the late 1960s, high-level languages such as PL/S, BLISS, BCPL, extended ALGOL (for Burroughs large systems) and C included some degree of access to low-level programming functions. One method for this is inline assembly, in which assembly code is embedded in a high-level language that supports this feature. Some of these languages also allow architecture-dependent compiler optimization directives to adjust the way a compiler uses the target processor architecture.

References 

 
Programming language classification
Articles with example C code